Howard Robinson "Lefty" Mills (May 10, 1912 – September 23, 1982) was a Major League Baseball pitcher. He was a native of Dedham, Massachusetts.

References

External links

1912 births
1982 deaths
Major League Baseball pitchers
St. Louis Browns players
San Antonio Missions players
Baseball players from Massachusetts
St. Paul Saints (AA) players
Sportspeople from Dedham, Massachusetts